OpenText Corporation (styled as opentext) is a Canadian company that develops and sells enterprise information management (EIM) software.

OpenText, headquartered in Waterloo, Ontario, Canada, is Canada's fourth-largest software company as of 2022, and recognized as one of Canada's top 100 employers 2016 by Mediacorp Canada Inc.

OpenText software applications manage content or unstructured data for large companies, government agencies, and professional service firms. OpenText aims its products at addressing information management requirements, including management of large volumes of content, compliance with regulatory requirements, and mobile and online experience management.

OpenText employs over 16,000 people worldwide, and is a publicly traded company, listed on the NASDAQ (OTEX) and the Toronto Stock Exchange (OTEX).

History
Timothy Bray, with University of Waterloo professors Frank Tompa and Gaston Gonnet, founded OpenText Corporation in 1991. It grew out of OpenText Systems Inc., founded in 1989. The founders spun the company off from a University of Waterloo project that developed technology to index the Oxford English Dictionary.

Key people involved later include Tom Jenkins, who joined the company as COO in 1994. Tom Jenkins later became president and Chief Executive Officer, and has been Executive Chairman since 2013. John Shackleton served as president from 1998 to 2011, and as CEO from 2005 to 2011. Mark Barrenechea has been president and CEO of OpenText since 2012. Mark Barrenechea was named Canadian Business CEO of the year in 2015. From January 2016, Steve Murphy served as the President; however, the company eliminated the position in Q1 2017.

OpenText is a supporter of the University of Waterloo Stratford Campus, contributing both funds and in-kind services to the school.

In July 2020, OpenText has partnered with NINJIO. The collaboration strengthens Webroot Security Awareness Training with interactive, Hollywood-style videos showcasing viral material aimed at encouraging cyber-resilient activities such as phishing emails and inappropriate URLs detected.

Acquisitions
In 2003, OpenText acquired IXOS Software AG.

In 2004, OpenText acquired Artesia.

In 2006, OpenText acquired Hummingbird Ltd. for US$489 million.

In 2008, the company acquired Captaris, Inc. for US$131 million.

In 2009, the company acquired Vignette Corporation for US$321 million in cash and stock.

In 2012, the company acquired EasyLink for US$232 million.

In 2014, OpenText acquired GXS Inc. and integrated it into their OpenText Business Network, which then acquired Inovis. In 2014 they also acquired Cordys for $33 million, and Actuate.

In 2015, OpenText acquired Daegis for US$13.5 million.

On September 12, 2016, OpenText further expanded its share of the enterprise content management software market by buying that division of Dell EMC, which included Documentum, for US$1.6 billion. OpenText had originally had Documentum and Hummingbird, Ltd., as its chief competitors in this space, but this acquisition brought the long-time third competitor in Documentum under one corporate roof.  Also in 2016, OpenText acquired Recommind after previously engaging with the company as a strategic partner.

In 2017, OpenText acquired Guidance Software for US$240 million, and Covisint for US$103 million, which they integrated into their OpenText Business Network.

In 2018, OpenText acquired Liaison Technologies for US$310 million, which they integrated into their OpenText ALLOY Platform.

In 2019, OpenText acquired Catalyst Repository Systems, and then acquired Carbonite Inc. (including Webroot and Mozy, which Carbonite Inc. had earlier acquired) for approximately US$1.45 billion.

In 2020, OpenText acquired Xmedius for US$75 million.

In 2021, OpenText announced planned acquisition of Zix Corp for US$860 million, and in November, OpenText completed the acquisition of Bricata enabling next-generation Network Detection & Response (NDR) technology to the OpenText Security and Protection Cloud.

In 2022, OpenText announced it would acquire British software firm Micro Focus in a deal valued at US$6billion, which finalized in January 2023.

Products 
OpenText's products include enterprise content management (OpenText Content Suite, OpenText Extended ECM, OpenText Documentum), Business Network, customer experience management (OpenText Customer Experience Platform), digital process automation (OpenText AppWorks), discovery (OpenText Axcelerate eDiscovery and Investigations), security (OpenText EnCase Forensic Security Suite, OpenText Carbonite and Webroot solutions), and AI and analytics (OpenText Magellan Product Suite).

OpenText announced cloud-native containerized versions of many of the company's software applications in April 2020.

OpenText Documentum 

OpenText Documentum is an information management platform, named after the company Documentum that originally developed the software suite. In 2003, EMC acquired Documentum for $1.7 billion. In 2016, EMC was acquired by Dell, becoming Dell EMC. Subsequently, all of the Documentum intellectual property was sold to OpenText Corporation.

OpenText Document Server Alchemy Edition 

Rebranded product resulting from the acquisition of Captaris

OpenText Content Suite Platform 
In 1996, the product originally called "Livelink" became OpenText's. Between 2003 and 2005, "Livelink" evolved from being the name of a single product to being a brand applied to the names of several OpenText software products. As a result of this change, "Livelink Server" became known as "Livelink Enterprise Server" (LES) and later "Livelink ECM. In 2012, OpenText introduced the OpenText Content Suite. Then the technology component formerly known as Livelink ECM - Enterprise Server became known as OpenText Content Server, which is now a key component of OpenText Content Suite Platform.

OpenText Archive Center (Archive Server)  
First released in May 2006, Livelink Enterprise Archive (LEA) became Archive Server in 2010. It is a key product in the Extended ECM scenario. With Version 16, the Archive Server was renamed to Archive Center.

OpenText Magellan  
In July 2017, OpenText launched its artificial intelligence (AI) and analytics platform, OpenText Magellan, at the company's Enterprise World conference. The platform combines open source machine learning with advanced analysis and is able to merge, manage, and analyze both structure data and unstructured, textual content. It offers machine-assisted decision-making, automation, and business optimization in a scalable, flexible solution.

OpenText RightFax  
OpenText RightFax provides network-based fax functionality to enterprise organizations and has evolved through many versions since it was first released in 1992.

RedDot and content authoring
RedDot, founded in 1993, was a business unit of OpenText Corporation that the company refers to as the Web Solutions Group. The software assists in the management of content, with regulatory compliance and industry specific requirements.

Its core product, RedDot CMS is a Windows-based server application that provides Web content management in a multi-user environment. Complementary to the CMS or as a standalone product, LiveServer aggregates disparate document resources and serves them as Web pages.

Red dots on the authoring interface indicated sections of editable content for each web page, hence the name RedDot for the product. This feature was popular with customers and won awards in 2001 for its usability. By 2006 RedDot was one of the few WCM vendors that continued to develop their own content authoring interface. Most other WCM vendors had moved to open source alternatives, or had licensed an online rich-text editor from commercial vendors such as Ephox or Ektron. In response to customer attempts to work around the limitations of the RedDot editor by installing other editors RedDot developed an integration layer to support CKeditor and Ephox EditLive! as alternative editors. In 2009 RedDot (rebranded the OpenText Web Solutions Group) made the Telerik RadEditor available alongside the existing RedDot editor for CMS 9.

After the acquisition of Vignette, Web Solutions was rebranded again to become OpenText Web Site Management.

OpenText Intelligent Capture (formerly Captiva)
Captiva Software became a subsidiary of OpenText in 2017. It makes software for document information processing and data capture from paper and electronic documents and provides related services. Information in the form of extracted content and files are acquired in the Captiva Solution and then delivered for storage or workflow into document management systems such as those from Documentum, OpenText, Microsoft, or IBM. In 2019 Captiva was rebranded as OpenText Intelligent Capture.

OpenText AppEnhancer (formerly ApplicationXtender)
AppEnhancer is a content management system that manages, organizes, and stores information from an application or as an extension to an existing application. The product was acquired during OpenText's purchase of Dell EMC's ECD (Enterprise Content Division) in 2017.

References

External links
 

Canadian companies established in 1991
Companies based in Waterloo, Ontario
Software companies established in 1991
Companies listed on the Nasdaq
Companies listed on the Toronto Stock Exchange
Content management systems
Customer communications management
Internet search engines
Portal software
Records management technology
Business software companies
Software companies of Canada
Customer relationship management software companies
1991 establishments in Ontario
Canadian brands
1996 initial public offerings